Simon Khaya Moyo (1 October 1945 – 14 November 2021) was a Zimbabwean politician and Chairman of ZANU-PF at the time of his death. He was the Ambassador of Zimbabwe to South Africa from 2007 to 2011.

He was appointed Media, Information and Broadcasting Services Minister in October 2017, taking over from Christopher Mushohwe.  However, he was later removed from the Zimbabwe Cabinet in September 2018.

Khaya-Moyo was placed on the United States sanctions list in 2003.

He died on 14 November 2021 due to cancer at Mater Dei Hospital in Bulawayo.

Early life

Simon Khaya-Moyo was born on 1 October 1945 in the Bukalanga Sanzukwi area of Bulilima in Matabeleland South Province. He did his secondary education studies at Fletcher High School in Gweru and left in 1965. From 1966 to 1967, he served as a research assistant at Mpilo Hospital in Bulawayo.

Political career
In 1968, he crossed the border into Zambia to join the liberation struggle.

See also
South Africa-Zimbabwe relations

References 

1945 births
2021 deaths
Ambassadors of Zimbabwe to South Africa
ZANU–PF politicians
21st-century Zimbabwean politicians
Deaths from cancer in Zimbabwe